Eesti Ajalehed was an Estonian publishing company, which published the newspapers Maaleht and Eesti Ekspress. The company belonged to the Tallinn Stock Exchange. The company operated in Tallinn. In 2015, Ekspress Grupp merges its subsidiaries AS Eesti Ajalehed and AS Delfi into one company, which was named AS Ekspress Meedia.

References

External links 
 

Publishing companies of Estonia
Mass media in Tallinn